Mexicano is a Spanish word that means "Mexican" (see: Mexican (disambiguation)).

Mexicano may also refer to:

People
 José Gonzalo Rodríguez Gacha a.k.a. "El Mexicano" ("The Mexican"), a Colombian drug lord who was one of the leaders of the Medellín Cartel 
 Rudy Grant, a reggae DJ who has released albums under the stage name "The Mexicano"
 Mexicano, another term for Nahuatl, a group of languages of the Uto-Aztecan language family.

See also 
 Mexican (disambiguation)
 Mexicana (disambiguation)